Bibhutibhushan Mukhopadhyay (24 October 1894 – 30 July 1987) was an Indian Bengali language author.

Works

Novels
Nilanguriyo, later adapted for film
Swargadapi Gariyasee
Tomrai Bharasa
Uttarayan
Kanchan Mulya, later adapted for film
Dolgovinder Karacha
Rup Holo Abhisap
Nayan Bou
Panka Pallab
Kadam

The Ranu short stories
Ranur Prothom Vagh
Ranur Ditio Vagh
Ranur Tritio Vagh
Ranur Kothamala

Other short stories
Hathe Khari
Rel Ranga
Barjatri
Basar
Kokil Deke Chhilo

Travelogues
Kushi Panganer Chithi
Duar Hote Adure
Ajatar Joyjatra

Natak
Barjatri, later adapted for film and television
Tansil

Children's books
Ponur Chithi
Kilasher Patrani
Hese Jao (poetry)

References

External links
 
 

Bengali writers
Bengali-language writers
Recipients of the Rabindra Puraskar
Recipients of the Ananda Purashkar
1894 births
1987 deaths
People from Bihar